Blue Feather was a Dutch male vocal/instrumental group, who had a single called "Let's Funk Tonight", in the UK Singles Chart. It was released on the Mercury label, entered the chart on 3 July 1981, and rose to a high of number 50; it remained in the charts for four weeks. This track was used on the 2008 compilation album Return to the Playboy Mansion by Dimitri from Paris. 

The group released two albums: Feather Funk in 1982, and Shadows Of The Night in 1985. Their singles include "Call Me Up" (1981), "It's Love" (1981), "Let It Out" (1983) and "After Midnight" (1986).

References

Dutch pop music groups